Lycomorphodes flavipars is a moth of the family Erebidae. It was described by George Hampson in 1909. It is found in Colombia.

References

 

Cisthenina
Moths described in 1909